Curt Beech is an American art director and production designer. He won a Primetime Emmy Award in the category Outstanding Production Design for his work on the television program Only Murders in the Building. His win was shared with Jordan Jacobs and Rich Murray.

References

External links 

Living people
Place of birth missing (living people)
Year of birth missing (living people)
American art directors
American production designers
Primetime Emmy Award winners